The Hunter 320 is an American sailboat that was designed by the Hunter Design Team and first built in 2000.

The 320 is a development of the 1997 Hunter 310.

Production
The design was built by Hunter Marine in the United States between 2000 and 2002, but it is now out of production.

Design
The Hunter 320 is a recreational keelboat, built predominantly of fiberglass. It has a fractional sloop B&R rig, a raked stem, a walk-through reverse transom, an internally-mounted spade-type rudder controlled by a wheel and a fixed fin keel. It displaces  and carries  of ballast.

The factory-supplied standard equipment included: 110% roller furling genoa, two-speed self-tailing winches, over-cockpit stainless steel arch-mounted mainsheet, dorade vents, marine VHF radio, knotmeter, depth sounder, hardwood cabin sole, private forward and aft cabins, dinette table that converts to a double berth, chart table, microwave oven, stainless steel sink, two-burner liquefied petroleum gas stove, icebox, anchor four life jackets, hand-held flares and an emergency tiller. Available options included: spinnaker and associated winches, mast-furling mainsail, stainless steel hand rails, autopilot, electric anchor winch and a mainsheet traveller.

The design has a PHRF racing average handicap of 168 with a high of 156 and low of 174.

Operational history
In a review for Boats.com, Roger Marshal wrote, "At first glance, the Hunter 320 looks like a normal 32-footer on steroids. It is a big, bulky boat made seemingly even larger by the rounded cockpit and transom step. But walk below and you immediately lose the feeling of bulk. The interior is huge and plush. Beam is carried well aft, giving a transverse doubled berth under the cockpit. The boat has every attribute that you would want in a 32-footer and then some." Marshall concludes, "In all, this is a boat that fulfills its function easily and capably but not one that you would sail long distances offshore in. The boat comes across as a good coastal cruiser that can carry a family and a few friends from port to port."

See also
List of sailing boat types

Related development
Hunter 31
Hunter 310

Similar sailboats
Allmand 31
Beneteau 31
Catalina 310
Corvette 31
Douglas 31
Herreshoff 31
Marlow-Hunter 31
Niagara 31
Roue 20
Tanzer 31

References

External links
Official brochure

Keelboats
2000s sailboat type designs
Sailing yachts
Sailboat type designs by Hunter Design Team
Sailboat types built by Hunter Marine